Longyang Subdistrict is a subdistrict and the county seat of Hanshou County in Hunan, China. Dividing a part of the former Longyang Town, the subdistrict was established in December 2015. The subdistrict has 11 communities and 5 villages under its jurisdiction, its seat is Chengnan Community.

Communities and villages

References

External links
 Official Website (Chinese / 中文)

Hanshou
County seats in Hunan
Subdistricts of Hunan